Sanam Khli is a sub-district (tambon) in the Bang Krathum District of Phitsanulok Province (amphoe), Thailand.

Geography
Sanam Khli borders Khok Salut to the north, Bang Krathum to the east, and Phichit Province to the south and west. Most of Sanam Khli lies within the Nan Basin, although a narrow strip of land on the west side of the sub-district lies within the Yom Basin. Both basins are part of the Chao Phraya Watershed. The Nan River flows through Sanam Khli at Ban Sanam Khli.

Administration
The sub-district is divided into six smaller divisions called (mubans).  There are two villages in Sanam Khli. Ban Sanam Khli occupies five of the mubans. Sanam Khli is administered by a tambon administrative organization (TAO). The mubans in Sanam Khli are enumerated as follows:

Temples
Sanam Khli is home to the following two temples, which are both in Ban Sanam Khli:
Wat Sanam Khli (East Temple)
Wat Sanam Khli (West Temple)

References

Tambon of Phitsanulok province
Populated places in Phitsanulok province